is the second studio album Japanese idol duo Pink Lady, released through Victor Entertainment on November 5, 1978. The title track and "Friends" are Pink Lady's versions of the opening and ending themes of the anime , which were originally recorded by Young Fresh. The album also includes a medley of commercial jingles of products endorsed by the duo.

The album peaked at No. 10 on Oricon's weekly albums chart and sold over 46,000 copies.

Track listing 
All lyrics are written by Yū Aku; all music is composed and arranged by Shunichi Tokura.

Charts

Footnotes

References

External links
 
 
 

1978 albums
Japanese-language albums
Pink Lady (band) albums
Victor Entertainment albums